The Tigres Strait, formerly known as Tigres Bay or Great Fish Bay, is a strait in Angola, located in Namibe Province, serving as a separation between the Angolan mainland and the Tigres Island.

Geography
It once had a small peninsula on its eastern side, with its isthmus in the south and a well established fishing village named Saint Martin of the Tigers (in Portuguese: São Martinho dos Tigres). The ocean broke through the isthmus of the peninsula in 1962 and the water line was severed. Tigres became an island overnight, Tigres Island, the largest island of Angola. 

Currently, most of the area of the former bay has become a strait between the island and the mainland. Of the original bay, only a small inlet open to the north —the Saco dos Tigres— remains at the southern end.

See also
 Geography of Angola

References

Straits of the Atlantic Ocean
Bays of Angola
Straits of Africa